Kosti (also Kusti) is one of the major cities (population  was 173,599) in Sudan that lies south of Khartoum, the capital of Sudan, and stands on the western bank of the White Nile river opposite Rabak(the capital of the White Nile state)where there is a bridge.  The city is served by Kosti Railway Station and Rabak Airport.

History 
Kosti was founded shortly after 1899 by the Greek merchant Konstantinos "Kostas" Mourikis, who arrived in Sudan along with his brother following the Anglo-Egyptian victory over the indigenous Mahdist state. He set up a store on the White Nile, where pilgrims from West Africa to Mecca and Southern trade routes crossed. The settlement soon grew to a town and was named after "Kostas", illustrating the important role played by the Greeks in Sudan, especially in the field of trade.

Economy 
The large Kenana sugar refinery is located in Rabak east of the city.

Kosti is home to the El Imam El Mahdi University, established in 1994 as a public university funded by the Ministry of Higher Education and Scientific Research.
It is named in honor of Muhammad Ahmad, the leader of the Mahdia revolution in Sudan (1885-1898).

Climate
Kosti, like most of Sudan, has a very dry climate. The climate stays hot throughout the year, even into November temperatures still break 100 degrees.

Gallery

See also 

 Railway stations in Sudan

References 
 UN population report

Populated places in White Nile (state)